Mustafa Dağıstanlı Sports Hall is a multi-purpose indoor sport venue located in İlkadım district of Samsun Province, northern Turkey. It was named in honor of Mustafa Dağıstanlı (born 1931), a local sport wrestler, who became twice Olympic and three times world champion in freestyle.

The sports hall is situated in Hançerli Mah., Atatürk Boulevard. 17, İlkadım. The groundbreaking of the building took place on December 17, 2011. It was opened in presence of Minister of Youth and Sports Suat Kılıç on June 2, 2013. It is situated on Adnan Menderes Boulevard next to Ondokuz Mayıs University's İlkadım Campus.  The sports hall hosts a great variety of sports in addition to badminton, basketball, fencing and volleyball competitions, like boxing, judo, karate, taekwondo, kickboxing, wrestling, weightlifting, table tennis, chess and shooting. The venue has a seating capacity for 2,000 spectators, including 100 for VIP, 100 for media members, 100 for accredited sportspeople and 80 for physically handicapped people.

International events hosted
In 2016, the European Boxing Olympic Qualification Tournament and FIBA Europe Under-18 Championship were held in the sports hall. The venue will host volleyball events of the 2017 Summer Deaflympics.

References

Sports venues in Samsun
Indoor arenas in Turkey
Badminton venues
Basketball venues in Turkey
Volleyball venues in Turkey
Boxing venues in Turkey
Fencing venues
Judo venues
Taekwondo venues
Weightlifting venues
Wrestling venues
Table tennis venues
Sports venues completed in 2013
2013 establishments in Turkey
İlkadım